The 2005 Miami Dolphins season was the franchise’s 40th overall, the 36th as a member of the National Football League. The Dolphins managed to improve upon their previous season’s output of 4–12, posting a winning record of 9–7. They finished the season on a six-game win streak and ended their season with an upset over the defending back-to-back Super Bowl champion New England Patriots, the Dolphins' second straight year beating them as defending champions.

Staff

Roster

Schedule 
In addition to their regular games with AFC East rivals, the Dolphins played teams from the AFC West and NFC South as per the schedule rotation, and also played intraconference games against the Browns and the Titans based on divisional positions from 2004.

Standings

References 

Miami Dolphins seasons
Miami Dolphins
Miami Dolphins